Studençan is a village in the municipality of Suva Reka, Kosovo. The new name was given after the Kosovo War. Studenčane is close to Suva Reka, 5 km west. The village has approximately 650 houses and over 5000 inhabitants, 2000 of which also live outside of the country for different reasons; work, family, etc., etc. Unemployment issues still affect the village.

Notes and references 

Notes:

References:

Villages in Suva Reka